The Americas Zone was one of three Zones of Davis Cup competition in 2003.

Group I

Bahamas relegated to Group II in 2004.
Ecuador and Canada advance to World Group Play-off.

Group II

Netherlands Antilles and Colombia relegated to Group III in 2004.
Paraguay promoted to Group I in 2004.

Group III

Participating Teams
 
 
  — relegated to Group IV in 2004
 
  — promoted to Group II in 2004
  — promoted to Group II in 2004
  — relegated to Group IV in 2004

Group IV

Participating Teams
 
 
 
 
  — promoted to Group III in 2004
  — promoted to Group III in 2004

See also

 
Americas
Davis Cup Americas Zone